Canadian federal elections have provided the following results in Montérégie.

Regional Profile
Montérégie stretches from Montreal's South Shore suburbs into the countryside to the east.  The former have been a battleground between the Liberals and the Bloc Québécois because of the collapse of the Progressive Conservative Party in 1993. The more rural ridings of Saint-Jean, Verchères—Les-Patriotes and Chambly—Borduas are Bloquist strongholds. Vaudreuil-Soulanges, west of Montreal, has a significant Anglophone population and can usually be expected to vote Liberal—its 2004 fall to the BQ on election night was one of the biggest surprises on election night. The fallout from the sponsorship scandal allowed the Bloc to sweep the region in 2006 for the first time, although the Liberals regained the traditional Liberal seat of Brossard-La Prairie in 2008, albeit on a judicial recount.  Conservative support picked up significantly in the rural areas but remains very low in the suburban areas.

However, these distinctions were overwhelmed by the surge of NDP support in Quebec in the 2011 election, with the party sweeping every seat in this region by wide margins—in no case by less than 3,500 votes, and in several cases by nearly or more than 10,000 votes. In a huge reversal of fortunes, the NDP was cut down to just 3 seats in the region during the 2015 election, in which the Liberals surged to captured most of the region's seats. Renewed Bloc strength allowed them to capture several seats at the NDP and Liberals' expense in 2019.

Votes by party throughout time

2019 - 43nd General Election

2015 - 42nd General Election

2011 - 41st General Election

2008 - 40th General Election

2006 - 39th General Election

2004 - 38th General Election

Maps 

Beauharnois-Salaberry
Brossard-La Prairie
Chambly-Borduas
Châteauguay-Saint-Constant
Longueuil
Saint-Bruno-Saint-Hubert
Saint-Jean
Saint-Lambert
Vaudreuil-Soulanges
Verchères-Les-Patriotes

2000 - 37th General Election

1997 - 36th General Election

1993 - 35th General Election

1988 - 35th General Election

1984 - 34th General Election 

Canadian federal election results in Quebec
Montérégie